Courthouse Historic District may refer to:

Courthouse Historic District (Logansport, Indiana), listed on the National Register of Historic Places in Cass County, Indiana
Courthouse Historic District (Kalispell, Montana), listed on the National Register of Historic Places in Flathead County, Montana
Courthouse Residential Historic District, listed on the National Register of Historic Places in Iron County, Michigan